Khar Kush also Khaṟkus ( is a mountain in the Hindu Kush of Afghanistan. It is located in the provinces of Baghlān and Kapisa.

Hindu Kush
Two-thousanders of Afghanistan
Landforms of Baghlan Province
Landforms of Kapisa Province